The 1996 Delaware gubernatorial election was held on November 5, 1996, to elect the governor of the state of Delaware. Incumbent governor Thomas Carper, the Democratic nominee, was re-elected to his second and final term in a landslide over Republican nominee and Delaware State Treasurer Janet Rzewnicki. Both were unopposed in their respective primaries. Tom Carper became the first Democratic governor in state history to win 2 consecutive terms.

General election

Results

References

1996
Gubernatorial
Delaware